Balumama Maharaj, (born Ballappa, 3 October 1892 – 4 September 1966) was an Indian guru, mystic, and a Yogi.

Life and miracles

Early life 
Balumama was born on 3 October 1892 in a village called Akkol in Chikkodi taluk of Belgaum district in Karnataka in a Hindu Kuruba (Shepherd) family. His father was a shepherd named Mayappa and his mother's name was Sundara. He spent his childhood with his parents but was always lost in meditation. He later went on to live with his cousin and was married to her daughter against his will. The marriage did not last long. He was given about 15 sheep by his in-laws which he started to tend.

Temple 
Balumama attained samadhi at the age of 73 in 1966 in a village called Adamapur in Kolhapur district of Maharashtra. A temple was built in his memory in Adamapur which lies between Nipani in Karnataka and Radhanagari in Maharashtra. The Temple is managed by Shri Balumama Sansthana. The small flock have now grown to 40,000 sheep, which are looked after by his devotees and still considered sacred.

Books
 'Shri Sant Sadguru Devavtari Balumama Charitra Granth' By Mr. C. S. Kulkarni (Marathi)
 'Bhav-Bhakticha Bhandara' By Mr. S. Killedar (Marathi)
 'Shri Balumama Vijaygranth' By Dr. Shrikrishna D. Deshmukh (Marathi)
 'Shri Sant Sadguru Balumama Arati Sangraha' By Mr. B. B. Aidmale (Marathi)
 'Sri Sant Sadguru Balumama Namanstotra' By Madhav Joshi (Marathi)
 'Sri Sant Balumama Stavan' By Mr. C. G. Patil (Marathi)

Movies and TV show
 'Sant Balumama (VCD Marathi)' by Fountain, directed by Rajesh Limkar, produced by Shailesh Limkar.	
 'Sant Balumama (संत बाळू मामा) Full Movie' Bhakti Movie (Hindi Devotional Movie, Indian Movie, Hindi Movie), written and directed by Raju Fulkar.
 Balumama Chya Navan Chang Bhala by Colors Marathi.
ಪವಾಡ ಪುರುಷ in kannada by Colors Kannada

References

1892 births
1967 deaths
Marathi people
Kannada people
Herding castes
Indian Hindu yogis
20th-century Hindu religious leaders
People considered avatars by their followers
Spiritual teachers
20th-century Indian philosophers